Sedat Taşcı (born July 8, 1985) is a boxer from Turkey, who participated in the 2004 Summer Olympics for his country. There he was stopped in the first round of the Men's Featherweight (57 kg) division by South Korea's eventual third Jo Seok-hwan. He qualified for the Athens Games by ending up in second place at the 3rd AIBA European 2004 Olympic Qualifying Tournament in Gothenburg, Sweden. In the final he lost to Romania's Viorel Simion.

References
Sedat Tasci at Sports Reference

1985 births
Olympic boxers of Turkey
Featherweight boxers
Living people
Boxers at the 2004 Summer Olympics
Turkish male boxers
21st-century Turkish people